Maritime may refer to:

Geography
 Maritime Alps, a mountain range in the southwestern part of the Alps
 Maritime Region, a region in Togo
 Maritime Southeast Asia
 The Maritimes, the Canadian provinces of Nova Scotia, New Brunswick, and Prince Edward Island
 Maritime County, former county of Poland, existing from 1927 to 1939, and from 1945 to 1951
 Neustadt District, Reichsgau Danzig-West Prussia, known from 1939 to 1942 as Maritime District, a former district of Reichsgau Danzig-West Prussia, Nazi Germany, from 1939 to 1945
 The Maritime Republics, thalassocratic city-states on the Italian peninsula during the Middle Ages

Museums
 Maritime Museum (Belize)
 Maritime Museum (Macau), China
 Maritime Museum (Malaysia)
 Maritime Museum (Stockholm), Sweden

Music
 Maritime (album), a 2005 album by Minotaur Shock
 Maritime (band), an American indie pop group
 "The Maritimes" (song), a song on the 2005 album Boy-Cott-In the Industry by Classified
 "Maritime", a 2002 song from Oceanic (Isis album)
 "Maritime", a 2018 song from Illusive Golden Age (Augury album)

Other
 Maritime history, the study of human activity at sea
 Maritime transport, the transport of people or goods on water
 Maritime pilot, a marine pilot, harbor pilot, port pilot, ship pilot

See also 
 Maritime English (disambiguation)
 Marine (disambiguation)
 Maritima (disambiguation)
 Maritimum (disambiguation)
 Maritimus (disambiguation)